ICAN:  Infant, Child, & Adolescent Nutrition is a defunct peer-reviewed medical journal that covers the field of pediatric nutrition. The editor-in-chief was Linda Heller. It was published from 2009 to 2015 by SAGE Publications.

Abstracting and indexing 
ICAN:  Infant, Child, & Adolescent Nutrition is abstracted and indexed in CABI and Scopus.

References

External links 
 

SAGE Publishing academic journals
English-language journals
Pediatrics journals
Bimonthly journals
Publications established in 2009
Publications disestablished in 2015
Nutrition and dietetics journals